The 2010–11 Metbank Pro40 Championship was the ninth edition of the List A cricket tournament in Zimbabwe. In previous, and following, years the competition was a 50-over tournament, but this edition was played in a 40-over format. The competition began on 11 September 2010 and the final was played on 27 March 2011.

The first semi-final was won by the Southern Rocks who dismissed the Matabeleland Tuskers for just 94, with Brian Vitori leading the way with a five-wicket haul. The second semi-final saw the Mid West Rhinos eliminate the defending champions Mountaineers. After the Rhinos compiled a moderate total of 200/6 with Malcolm Waller scoring a 54 and a late fightback by the tail which saw Solomon Mire compile 45*, Mountaineers were dismissed for only 84, with spinner Graeme Cremer taking 4/13.

Southern Rocks won the tournament for the first time, comfortably defeating the Mid West Rhinos by 8 wickets in the final.

Mountaineers South African batsman Jonathan Beukes was the tournament's leading run-scorer with a total of 301 runs. Mountaineers bowler Natsai M'shangwe was the leading wicket-tacker with a total of 13 wickets.

Points table

 Qualified for the knockout stages

Knockout stage

Semi-finals

Final

References

External links
 Series home at ESPN Cricinfo

2010–11 Zimbabwean cricket season
Metbank Pro40 Championship
Pro50 Championship